The 2021 Kuurne–Brussels–Kuurne was the 73rd edition of the Kuurne–Brussels–Kuurne cycling classic. It was held on 28 February 2021 as a category 1.Pro race on the 2021 UCI Europe Tour and the 2021 UCI ProSeries. The race formed the latter half of the opening weekend of the Belgian road cycling season with UCI WorldTour race Omloop Het Nieuwsblad held the previous day.

Teams 
Seventeen of the nineteen UCI WorldTeams were joined by eight UCI ProTeams to make up the twenty-five teams that participated in the race. All but one team entered seven riders for a total of 174 riders, many of whom also contested the previous day's Omloop Het Nieuwsblad;  was the exception with six riders, as Charlie Quarterman sustained injuries from a crash during that race. 114 riders finished.

UCI WorldTeams

 
 
 
 
 
 
 
 
 
 
 
 
 
 
 
 
 

UCI ProTeams

Result

References

External links 

2021
Kuurne–Brussels–Kuurne
Kuurne–Brussels–Kuurne
Kuurne–Brussels–Kuurne
Kuurne–Brussels–Kuurne